Mahmud Yayale Ahmed,  (born 15 April 1952) is a Nigerian civil servant and politician who served as Defence Minister of Nigeria.

Early life and education
Ahmed was born in the town of Shira in southern Azare, Bauchi State, to Ahmadu, an Islamic scholar and farmer. He attended Shira Primary School, Government Secondary School Azare, and then Ahmadu Bello University (ABU) in Zaria, Kaduna State, where he received a bachelor's degree in Political Science in 1976 and a master's degree in Public Administration in 1981. He completed his National Youth Service Corps (NYSC) service in 1977.

He has an honorary Doctorate Degree in Law awarded by the University of Abuja and an honorary Doctorate Degree of Letters by Bayero University.

Civil service and politics
Ahmed joined the Bauchi State Civil Service in 1977. In 1982, he became deputy secretary to the state's Ministry of Animal Health and Forestry Resources, and the next year, in 1983, he became acting permanent secretary to the Ministry of Rural Development and Cooperatives.

In 1986, he joined the federal government's civil service, holding various positions in the Ministries of Internal Affairs and of Education. He was a member of the 1988 Ministerial Committee on the Civil Service Reforms.

Ahmed was appointed to the position of Head of Civil Service of the Federation on December 18, 2000, by former President Olusegun Obasanjo, who described Ahmed as "Mr Civil Servant".

In May 2006, Yayale considered running for Governor or Bauchi State in the 2007 general election. According to Yahuza Bauchi, the people of Bauchi State were "clamouring for Alhaji Yayale Ahmed to assume the mantle of leadership in the state so as to consolidate the good works of Governor Adamu Mua'zu."

President Umaru Yar'Adua appointed him to the position of Defence Minister on July 26, 2007. He had no military experience prior to the appointment. On September 8, 2008, President Umaru Yar'Adua appointed him as the Secretary to the Government of the Federation (SGF) replacing Babagana Kingibe. In May 2011, President Goodluck Jonathan replaced Ahmed with Senator Anyi Pius Anyim.

Personal life
Ahmed is married with seven children. He speaks Hausa, Fulani, and English. He has 7 children, Khadija, Nabil, Halima, Ibrahim, Usman, Sagir and Nabila.

Titles 
Ahmed is the Ajiyan Katagum, a Katagum Emirate position, and the Akowojo of Idanre Kingdom, in Ondo State.

References

External links

Living people
1952 births
People from Bauchi State
Defence ministers of Nigeria
Ahmadu Bello University alumni
Nigerian Muslims